Catastia is a genus of snout moths. It was erected by Jacob Hübner in 1825, and is known from Bosnia and Herzegovina, Austria, Italy, and Greece.

Species
 Catastia acraspedella (Staudinger, 1879)
 Catastia actualis (Hulst, 1886)
 Catastia bistriatella (Hulst, 1895)
 Catastia incorruscella (Hulst, 1895)
 Catastia kistrandella Opheim, 1963
 Catastia marginea (Denis & Schiffermüller, 1775)
 Catastia subactualis Neunzig, 2003
 Catastia uniformalis (Hampson, 1903)

References

Phycitini
Pyralidae genera